Terrence Kaufman (1937 – March 3, 2022) was an American linguist specializing in documentation of unwritten languages, lexicography, Mesoamerican historical linguistics and language contact phenomena. He was an emeritus professor of linguistics and anthropology at the University of Pittsburgh.

Academic career

Kaufman received his PhD in Linguistics from the University of California at Berkeley in 1963 with his thesis on the grammar of Tzeltal. Post-PhD, he taught at The Ohio State University (1963-1964) and at UC Berkeley (1964-1970) prior to taking up the position at the University of Pittsburgh that he held until his retirement in 2011.

Over the course of his career, Kaufman produced descriptive and comparative-historical studies of languages of the Mayan, Siouan, Hokan, Uto-Aztecan, Mixe–Zoquean and Oto-Manguean families. His work on empirical documentation of unwritten languages through fieldwork and training of native linguists gave rise to a rich body of published work as well as a substantial unpublished corpus of notes. Many of his articles were co-authored with other scholars such as Lyle Campbell, Sarah Thomason and John Justeson.

In a 1976 paper co-authored with Lyle Campbell, he advanced a theory that the Olmecs spoke a Mixe–Zoquean language, based on the substantial presence of early Mixe–Zoquean loans in many Mesoamerican languages, particularly from specific, culturally significant semantic domains. Along with Lyle Campbell and Thomas Smith-Stark, Kaufman carried out research published in Language (1986) which led to the recognition of Mesoamerica as a linguistic area.

In Language contact, Creolization, and genetic linguistics (1988), co-authored by Kaufman and Sarah Thomason, the authors developed a theoretical framework for the understanding of the processes of contact-induced language change.

Along with John Justeson, in 1993 he claimed to have successfully deciphered the Isthmian or Epi-Olmec script. This claim has been rejected by anthropologists Michael Coe and Stephen Houston in 2004 after using the decipher key on a recently discovered jade mask. Coe states that the result "turns out to be total nonsense and gobbledygook,". In the years prior to his death, Kaufman was involved in the "Project for the Documentation of the Languages of Mesoamerica" or PDLMA, focused on collecting standardized linguistic data from the under documented languages of Mesoamerica.

Early advocate and activist for role of native speakers 

In the early 1970s, Dr. Kaufman visited Guatemala to conduct linguistic surveys in the Mayan highlands which would eventually lead to his proposal for a classification of the Mayan languages.  In the process, he stopped at the Proyecto Linguistico Francisco Marroquin (PLFM) in Antigua Guatemala, a Guatemalan NGO intent on becoming a national Mayan-based resource institution.  

Together with PLFM staff, and inspired in part by MIT Kenneth Hale's 1960s unpublished paper, American Indians in Linguistics, Kaufman was a principal participant in the development of the PLFM's plan to train one hundred community-based native speakers of Mayan languages, mostly primary school graduates, to become descriptive linguists for their own languages.  He devoted his summers, uncompensated, to lead a level of training for them usually reserved for university students.  In this, he was augmented by a dozen professional linguists who were pursuing their PhDs.  Each served for several years under the auspices of the Peace Corps to provide year-round follow-up training.  

Under Dr. Kaufman's leadership, and in consultation with this corps of linguists and Mayan trainees, PLFM developed a proposal for "rational" alphabets for each of the Mayan languages which respected the integrity and unique features of each.  This Proposal for alphabets and orthographies for writing the Mayan languages was published in Spanish in January 1976 under Dr. Kaufman's name, by the Guatemalan Ministry of Education (which supported the proposal).  In the polarized environment of 1970s Guatemala, the proposal was not without powerful opponents.  With different goals, some insisted on orthographies which imposed the irregularities and values of Spanish language orthography on the Mayan languages, to the detriment of the latter.  

But the considerable corps of PLFM Mayan linguists, expertly trained by Kaufman and his colleagues, joined national congresses and debates at the highest level, bringing to the process recognized linguistic expertise, and they prevailed.  In the 1980s, the Guatemalan National Congress enacted legislation which made the alphabet that Dr. Kaufman and the PLFM had proposed (with one minor change) the legal, national alphabet of the country.  The Mayan trainees had been so engaged in the consideration of Kaufman's published proposal, that some later suggested that they should have been co-authors.

Kaufman was known by his friends as "Top Kat," after his initials, and sported a distinctive beard, beret and manner of dress unusual in Antigua at the time.  He was the kind of expert (like PLFM colleagues Dr. Nora England and Dr. Judith Maxwell after him), who was committed to sharing his hard-won expertise with native speakers themselves, enabling them to play the dominant roles in decisions about their own languages.  Native speakers trained by Terry Kaufman and colleagues assumed leadership of the PLFM in 1976.  They were invited to present technical papers at international academic meetings.  Carrying Guatemalan diplomatic passports, they represented and added to the prestige of not only their communities and linguistic groups, but of the country as a whole.

In the process, together with a PLFM linguistic aide, Jo Froman, whom he had trained, Kaufman completed his nation-wide linguistic surveys and a dialect boundary mapping exercise.  He then published a proposed classification for the Mayan languages.  Translated and edited by Lic. Flavio Rojas Lima of the Seminario de Integración Social, PLFM volunteer Margarita Cruz, PLFM Director Tony Jackson and supported by Ministry of Education language advisor Dr. Salvador Aguado Andreut, the proposal was published only in Spanish in 1974 as Idiomas de Mesoamerica (Languages of Meso-America).

Selected Bibliography

Articles
Campbell, Lyle, and Terrence Kaufman. 1976. "A Linguistic Look at the Olmec." American Antiquity 41(1):80–89.
Campbell, Lyle, and Terrence Kaufman. 1980. "On Mesoamerican linguistics." American Anthropologist 82:850–857.
Campbell, Lyle, Terrence Kaufman and Thomas C. Smith-Stark. "Meso-America as a Linguistic Area", Language Vol. 62, No. 3 (Sep. 1986), pp. 530–570.
Campbell, Lyle, Terrence Kaufman, "Mayan Linguistics: Where are we Now?"  Annual Review of Anthropology, Vol. 14, 1985 (1985), pp. 187–198.
Justeson, John, and Terrence Kaufman. 1993. "A decipherment of epi-Olmec hieroglyphic writing". Science 259:1703–1711.
Kaufman, Terrence. 1976. "Archaeological and Linguistic Correlations in Mayaland and Associated Areas of Meso-America" World Archaeology, Vol. 8, No. 1, Archaeology and Linguistics (Jun. 1976), pp. 101–118
Kaufman, Terrence. 1988. "A Research Program for Reconstructing Proto-Hokan: First Gropings." In Scott DeLancey, ed. Papers from the 1988 Hokan–Penutian Languages Workshop, pp. 50–168. Eugene, Oregon: Department of Linguistics, University of Oregon. (University of Oregon Papers in Linguistics. Publications of the Center for Amerindian Linguistics and Ethnography 1.)
Kaufman, Terrence. 1990. "Language History in South America: What we know and how to know more." In Doris L. Payne, ed. Amazonian Linguistics, pp. 13–74. Austin: University of Texas Press.

Books
Justeson, John, William Norman, Lyle Campbell, and Terrence Kaufman (1985). The Foreign Impact on Lowland Mayan Language and Script. Middle American Research Institute Publication 53. .
Kaufman, Terrence (1972). El Proto-Tzeltal-Tzotzil. Fonología comparada y diccionario reconstruido. México, UNAM. .
Thomason, Sarah G., and Terrence Kaufman (1988). Language contact, creolization, and genetic linguistics. Berkeley: University of California Press. .

References

Campbell, Lyle (1997). American Indian Languages, The Historical Linguistics of Native America. Oxford Studies in Anthropological Linguistics, Oxford University Press
Houston, Stephen, and Coe, Michael. 2004. "Has Isthmian Writing Been Deciphered?", Mexicon XXV: 151–161.
Brigham Young University press release on behalf of Brigham Young University archaeologist Stephen Houston and Yale University professor emeritus Michael Coe disputing Justeson/Kaufman findings.
Project for the Documentation of the Languages of Mesoamerica
 Kaufman's faculty page at the University of Pittsburgh
Autobiographical notes by Kaufman
 

1937 births
2022 deaths
Linguists from the United States
Historical linguists
Linguists of Mesoamerican languages
American Mesoamericanists
Anthropology educators
University of Pittsburgh faculty
University of California, Berkeley alumni
20th-century Mesoamericanists
21st-century Mesoamericanists
Linguists of Hokan languages
Linguists of Uto-Aztecan languages
Paleolinguists
Linguists of Mixe–Zoque languages
Linguists of Oto-Manguean languages
Mayanists
Linguists of indigenous languages of the Americas